The chestnut-bellied cotinga (Doliornis remseni) is a species of bird in the family Cotingidae. It is found in Colombia, Ecuador, and far northern Peru. Its natural habitats are subtropical or tropical moist montane forests and subtropical or tropical high-altitude grassland. Declines in range and population are likely owing to continuing habitat loss and degradation, which has caused this species to be classified as near threatened.

References

External links
BirdLife Species Factsheet.

chestnut-bellied cotinga
Birds of the Colombian Andes
Birds of the Ecuadorian Andes
chestnut-bellied cotinga
Taxonomy articles created by Polbot